Baltasar Tomás Carbonell y Sánchez, O.P. (6 January 1621 – 5 April 1692) was a Spanish friar of the Dominican Order. He served as royal confessor to King Charles II of Spain twice: from 1676 to 1678 and from 1682 to 1686. He was also the Bishop of Sigüenza from 1677 until his death in 1692.

See also 
 Catholic Church in Spain

References 

1621 births
1692 deaths
Spanish bishops
Dominican bishops
Spanish Dominicans
Bishops of Sigüenza